National Highway 527B (NH 527B) is a  National Highway in India.
It is important highway in India-Nepal connectivity.

References

National highways in India
National Highways in Bihar